is a railway station on the Keihan Electric Railway  Keihan Main Line and the Osaka Metro Sakaisuji Line in Chūō-ku, Osaka, Japan.

Kitahama is the closest station to the Osaka Securities Exchange and the financial district.

Lines 
 Keihan Electric Railway
 Keihan Main Line
 Osaka Metro
 (Station Number: K14)

Layout 

Keihan Electric Railway Kaihan Main Line
 There is an island platform with two tracks

Osaka Metro Sakaisuji Line
 There is an island platform with two tracks

Around the station 
Naniwa Bridge
Nakanoshima Park
Osaka Prefectural Nakanoshima Library
The Museum of Oriental Ceramics, Osaka
Naniwabashi Station on the Keihan Nakanoshima Line
Osaka Securities Exchange
Nomura Securities Co., Ltd. Osaka branch
Shionogi (Doshomachi)
The Kitahama
Capcom
Animation Do (subsidiary of Kyoto Animation)

Adjacent stations

External links
  Kitahama Station from Osaka Metro website
  Kitahama Station from Osaka Metro website
  Kitahama Station from Keihan Electric Railway website

Chūō-ku, Osaka
Railway stations in Osaka Prefecture
Osaka Metro stations
Railway stations in Japan opened in 1963